Gary Earle Gladding is an American physicist.

Gladding earned a doctorate in physics from Harvard University in 1971 and joined the University of Illinois at Urbana–Champaign faculty in 1973. He was elected a fellow of the American Physical Society in 1999, "[f]or leadership, pedagogical insights and creativity in adapting best-practice physics pedagogy to produce an innovative, integrated curriculum for calculus-based introductory physics courses appropriate for large research universities."

References

Year of birth missing (living people)
Harvard University alumni
20th-century American physicists
21st-century American physicists
Fellows of the American Physical Society
Living people
University of Illinois Urbana-Champaign faculty